The Queer North Film Festival is an annual film festival in Sudbury, Ontario, which presents an annual program of LGBT film. Presented by the Sudbury Indie Cinema Coop, the festival was staged for the first time in 2016. The same organization also stages the city's Junction North International Documentary Film Festival.

On two past occasions, the festival has presented retrospective screenings of 1990s documentary films about the LGBT community in Sudbury, Mum's the Word (Maman et Ève) in 2017 and The Pinco Triangle in 2018.

The festival's executive director is Beth Mairs.

Awards

2016

2018

See also
 List of LGBT film festivals
 List of film festivals in Canada

References

External links

LGBT film festivals in Canada
Festivals in Greater Sudbury
Film festivals in Ontario
Film festivals established in 2016
2016 establishments in Ontario
LGBT in Ontario